The "Bloody Code" was a series of laws in England, Wales and Ireland in the 18th and early 19th centuries which mandated the death penalty for a wide range of crimes. It was not referred to as such in its own time, but the name was given later owing to the sharply increased number of people given the death penalty, even for crimes considered minor or misdemeanor by 21st century standards.

History
In 1689 there were 50 offences on the statute book punishable by death in England and Wales, but that number had almost quadrupled by 1776, and it reached 220 by the end of the century. Most of the new laws introduced during that period were concerned with the defence of property, which some commentators have interpreted as a form of class suppression of the poor by the rich. George Savile, 1st Marquess of Halifax, expressed a contemporary view when he said that "Men are not hanged for stealing horses, but that horses may not be stolen". Grand larceny was one of the crimes that drew the death penalty; it was defined as the theft of goods worth more than 12 pence, about one-twentieth of the weekly wage for a skilled worker at the time. As the 18th century proceeded, jurors often deliberately under-assessed the value of stolen goods in order to avoid a mandatory death sentence. In the Kingdom of Ireland, a separate but subordinate state, a similar "Bloody Code" existed, but there were not as many capital crimes.

As the number of capital crimes increased, lawmakers sought a less harsh punishment that might still deter potential offenders and penal transportation with a term of indentured servitude became a more common punishment. This trend was expanded by the Transportation Act 1717 (16 Geo. 3 c.43), which regulated and subsidised the practice, until its use was suspended by the Criminal Law Act 1776. With the American Colonies already in active rebellion, parliament claimed its continuance "is found to be attended with various inconveniences, particularly by depriving this kingdom of many subjects whose labour might be useful to the community, and who, by proper care and correction, might be reclaimed from their evil course". This law would become known as the Hard Labour Act and the Hulks Act for both its purpose and its result. With the removal of the important transportation alternative to the death penalty, it would in part prompt the use of prisons for punishment and the start of prison building programmes. In 1785 Australia would be deemed a suitably desolate place to transport convicts; transportation would resume, now to a specifically planned penal colony, with the departure of the First Fleet in 1787.  It has been estimated that over one-third of all criminals convicted between 1788 and 1867 were transported to Australia, including Van Diemen's Land (now Tasmania). Some criminals could escape transportation if they agreed to join the British Army.  Jurist William Blackstone said of the Bloody Code:

Leon Radzinowicz listed 49 pages of "Capital Statutes of the Eighteenth Century" divided into 21 categories:

 High treason, including offences against the Protestant succession and the Protestant establishment
 Other offences against the State 
 Offences against public order, including riot and destruction of flood defences and bridges
 Offences against the administration of justice
 Offences against public health
 Offences against public revenue, including smuggling
 Petty treason and murder
 Stabbing, maiming and shooting at any person
 Rape, forcible abduction and other sexual offences
 Simple grand larceny and allied offences 
 Burglary and allied offences
 Larceny from the person
 Larceny and embezzlement by servants, Post Office employees, clerks and other agents
 Blackmail
 Offences by bankrupts
 Forgery of deeds, bonds, testaments, bills of exchange, stocks, stamps, banknotes, etc.
 Falsely personating another with intent to defraud
 Destroying ships to the prejudice of insurance companies
 Coinage offences
 Malicious injuries to property, including arson
 Piracy

Relaxation of the law

In 1823, the Judgement of Death Act 1823 made the death penalty discretionary for all crimes except treason and murder. Gradually during the middle of the nineteenth century the number of capital offences was reduced, and by 1861 was down to five. The last execution in the UK took place in 1964, and the death penalty was legally abolished in the following years for the crimes of:

 Murder, 1969 in England, Wales and Scotland, and 1973 in Northern Ireland
 Arson in royal dockyards, 1971
 Espionage, 1981
 Piracy with violence, 1998
 Treason, 1998
 Six military offences, 1998

See also
 Black Act 1723

Citations

General sources

Further reading

External links
 Amnesty International: History of the Abolition of the Death Penalty in the UK
 Rough justice – Victorian style, BBC News

Legal history of England
Legal history of Ireland
Legal history of Wales
Capital punishment in the United Kingdom
Georgian era